Edward Sidney Aarons (1916 – June 16, 1975) was an American writer who authored more than 80 novels from 1936 until 1975.  One of these was under the pseudonym "Paul Ayres" (Dead Heat), and 30 were written using the name "Edward Ronns".  He also wrote numerous stories for detective magazines such as Detective Story Magazine and Scarab.

Among other works of fiction, Aarons is known for his spy thrillers, particularly his "Assignment" series, which are set all over the world and have been translated into 17 languages. The 42 novels in this series starred CIA agent Sam Durell. The first "Assignment" novel was written in 1955, and Aarons continued writing the series until up to his death.

Early life
Aarons was born in Philadelphia, Pennsylvania, and earned a degree in Literature and History from Columbia University. He worked at various jobs to put himself through college, including jobs as a newspaper reporter and fisherman. In 1933, he won a short story contest as a student. In World War II he was in the United States Coast Guard, joining after the attack on Pearl Harbor in 1941. He finished his duty in 1945, having obtained the rank of Chief Petty Officer.

Assignment series 
Fictional CIA agent Sam Durell is the protagonist for all of the stories in this series. Though the publisher listed these as the “Assignment series”, it is just as well known as the “Sam Durell series". In later editions, the publisher also used “Sam Durell” in the blurb immediately after the front cover - For example, Assignment Ceylon has “This is number thirty-six of the famed Sam Durell novels—one of the bestselling suspense series in the history of publishing.” One consistent element is that all of the story titles started with the word “Assignment.”

The stories were written over a span of 28 years, from 1955 to 1983. Each book set, more or less, in the time it was written.

When initially issued the stories were not numbered and the publisher showed the list of available stories in the “Assignment” series in alphabetical order though often the alphabetical list did not include all of the previous stories. Later re-prints numbered the stories based the order in which they were first published though the list of stories just before the title page was still in alphabetical order. The list is shown in numbered/published order here. Each story is a standalone work and while they can be read in any order reading them in the order given here will provide some continuity as there are occasional references to people or incidents from previous assignments.

The publications were inconsistent in their formatting of the title with many editions using five dots as in Assignment . . . . . Angelina on the title page though some used a dash, others used a colon, and a few break the title on two lines with no punctuation. The formatting on the front covers was also mixed with most editions breaking the title onto two lines though a few had two lines with the Assignment followed by a hyphen or colon. The spines tended to use a hyphen though a few use a colon and Assignment Ceylon had no punctuation. For consistency, all of the titles are listed here with a hyphen.

 Assignment to Disaster (1955)
 Assignment—Treason (1956)
 Assignment—Suicide (1956)
 Assignment—Stella Marni (1957)
 Assignment—Budapest (1957)
 Assignment—Angelina (1958)
 Assignment—Madeleine (1958)
 Assignment—Carlotta Cortez (1959)
 Assignment—Helene (1959)
 Assignment—Lili Lamaris (1959)
 Assignment—Zoraya (1960)
 Assignment—Mara Tirana (1960)
 Assignment—Lowlands (1961)
 Assignment—Burma Girl (1961)
 Assignment—Ankara (1961)
 Assignment—Karachi (1962)
 Assignment—Sorrento Siren (1962)
 Assignment—Manchurian Doll (1963)
 Assignment—The Girl in the Gondola (1964)
 Assignment—Sulu Sea (1964)
 Assignment—The Cairo Dancers (1965)
 Assignment—School for Spies (1966)
 Assignment—Cong Hai Kill (1966)
 Assignment—Palermo (1966)
 Assignment—Black Viking (1967)
 Assignment—Moon Girl (1967)
 Assignment—Nuclear Nude (1968)
 Assignment—Peking (1969)
 Assignment—White Rajah (1970)
 Assignment—Star Stealers (1970)
 Assignment—Tokyo (1971)
 Assignment—Golden Girl (1971)
 Assignment—Bangkok (1972)
 Assignment—Maltese Maiden (1972)
 Assignment—Silver Scorpion (1973)
 Assignment—Ceylon (1973)
 Assignment—Amazon Queen (1974)
 Assignment—Sumatra (1974)
 Assignment—Quayle Question (1975)
 Assignment—Black Gold (1975)
 Assignment—Unicorn (1976)
 Assignment—Afghan Dragon (1976)

After Edward S. Aarons' death in 1975 his brother, William B. Aarons (1914-2002), continued to publish the series as executor of the Edward S. Aarons' estate.  Volumes 43 to 48 state Will B. Aarons as the author but were ghost written by Lawrence Hall. 
 Assignment—Sheba (1976)
 Assignment—Tiger Devil (1977)
 Assignment—13th Princess (1977)
 Assignment—Mermaid (1979)
 Assignment—Tyrant's Bride (1980)
 Assignment—Death Ship (1983)

Among his early works are The Art Studio Murders (1950) and The Decoy (1951).

References

External links 
 Edward S. Aarons Bibliography (partial)
 Edward S. Aarons Bibliography
 Edward Ronns Bibliography (A pseudonym used by Edward S. Aarons)
 Will B. Aarons Bibliography (William was Edward S. Aarons' brother and arranged to continue the Sam Durell series after Edward's death)
  American National Biography entry (vol. 1, pp. 3-4)
 Sam Durell Novels Description
 (this bibliography is limited to the author's speculative fiction work.)

1916 births
1975 deaths
American spy fiction writers
Columbia College (New York) alumni
Place of death missing
American male novelists
20th-century American novelists
20th-century American male writers
United States Coast Guard personnel of World War II
United States Coast Guard non-commissioned officers